BB cream is a marketing term that stands for blemish balm, blemish base, beblesh balm, and in Western markets, beauty balm. Products marketed as BB creams are generally designed to serve as a foundation, moisturizer, and sunscreen all at once. 

The marketing term "CC cream" was invented later and sometimes stands for Color Correction cream. Products marketed as CC creams claim to serve the same function as BB creams, with greater emphasis on homogenizing skin color. Differences between BB creams and CC creams vary from brand to brand.

History
What became BB cream was originally formulated in the 1960s in Germany by dermatologist Dr. Christine Schrammek to protect her patients' skin after facial peels and surgery.

Formulations

BB creams come in a variety of different formulations. Because Korean companies focused initially on the Korean and East Asian markets, they are offered in a limited number of hues. Instead of offering multiple shades for different skin colors, most formulae are designed to oxidize to match the user's skin tone. The skin-whitening properties of the cream as sold in the Asian market are an important element in its popularity.

The cream is promoted as a multi-tasker and all-in-one treatment, but Korean women mostly use it as an alternative to foundation, particularly those with Western formulations that tend to be too heavy for their tastes. The coverage is often mineral-based, and is intended to both cover and treat blemishes such as acne, sun spots, and age spots. Some brands claim anti-wrinkle, anti-inflammatory, and soothing effects for their products.

Markets
BB creams make up 13 percent of the cosmetics market in South Korea. Some Korean brands also offer BB creams for men. Notable Korean brands include Etude House, Missha, Nature Republic, Skin Food, Sulhwasoo, The Face Shop, SKIN79, Innisfree, Banila Co. and CLIO. 

Western cosmetics companies began to launch BB creams in the Western market in 2012, though some of these creams have been criticized for lacking the skin-caring functions that BB creams normally have, and for being no more than tinted moisturizer. Early arrivals included Boscia, Clinique, Dior, Estée Lauder, Garnier, Marcelle, Maybelline, Revlon and Smashbox. Lab Series makes a BB cream for men. Certain BB creams have been tailored for Western markets: Estée Lauder, for example, has not included the whitening properties in their formulation for North America.

Cruelty-free and vegan BB creams
BB creams advertised as cruelty-free include Smashbox (owned by Estée Lauder) and The Body Shop (owned by Natura & Co). The definition of "cruelty-free" varies. The Body Shop BB cream is certified by the Leaping Bunny Program, which means, according to the certification process, that no new animal testing has been used in any phase of product development by the company, its laboratories, or the suppliers of its ingredients. As of May 2013, Amore Pacific, which has as its subsidiaries Etude House and Laneige, has ended animal testing on all ingredients and cosmetics.

Products certified as cruelty-free may still contain animal products and may not be suitable for vegans. Vegan BB creams include the Superdrug own brand BB cream, BB cream souffles from Haut Cosmetics, 100% Pure Cosmetics, Multi-Mineral BB Cream from Pacifica, and the Evenly Radiant BB Crème from Dermae.

See also 
 DD cream

References

Further reading

"Miracle creams we can believe in", National Grad School, October 26, 2017.
Bhagwandas, Anita. "Beauty for dark skin: the BB cream debate", The Guardian, March 15, 2013.
Chowdary, Asha. "The BB cream is here to stay", The Times of India, February 25, 2012.
For it being introduced to South Korea and Japan in the 1980s, see Maclean's, January 11, 2012.
For the rest, see Koh Young-aah. "Perfect your look in Korea", The Korea Herald/Naver News, September 2, 2009.
Williams, Bronwyn. "The lowdown on BB Cream", Stuff.co.nz, March 26, 2012.

Cosmetics
German inventions